Sotha is a village in Haryana, India.

Demography
In 2011, it had 334 families with a population of 1716.

Location
The neolithic Sothi (archaeology) site is located near Nohar in Rajasthan, about 120 km west-south-west of Sothi.

The important archaeological site of Rakhigarhi is located about 30 km south.

Indus Valley Civilisation archaeology
Within 5 km to 10 km radius of Rakhigarhi are early, mature and late Harappan sites. To the north-west of Rakhigarhi are Panhari, Gyanpura, Kagsar, and Sulchani. South-west of Rakhigarhi are Sisai, Hisar, Rajpura, Narnaund, Pali and Masudpur.

Drishadvati River
Siswal is located about 70 km to the south-west, in the valley of the prehistoric Drishadvati River. The site of Rakhigarhi is likewise located in the valley of Drishadvati.

References

Cities and towns in Hisar district